Melanesobasis <ref>Donnelly, 1984 Melanesobasis gen. nov., a new genus of Fijian damselflies: A possible link between the platycnemidid Lieftinckia and certain coenagrionids (Zygoptera). Odonatologica, 13, 89–105.</ref> is a genus of damselflies in the family Coenagrionidae. Species are endemic to the Fiji Islands and Vanuatu. These damselflies inhabit fast‐moving forested streams at medium to high elevations (100–750 m).Donnelly, T. W. (1990). The Fijian genus Nesobasis Part 1: Species of Viti Levu, Ovalau, and Kadavu (Odonata: Coenagrionidae). New Zealand Journal of Zoology, 17, 87–117.

 Species 
The Global Biodiversity Information Facility lists:
 Melanesobasis annulata (Brauer, 1869)
 Melanesobasis bicellulare Donnelly, 1984
 Melanesobasis corniculata (Tillyard, 1924) (type species)M. corniculata marginata Donnelly, 1984
 Melanesobasis flavilabris (Selys, 1891)
 Melanesobasis maculosa Donnelly, 1984
 Melanesobasis mcleani Donnelly, 1984
 Melanesobasis prolixa Donnelly, 1984
 Melanesobasis simmondsi'' (Tillyard, 1924)

References

External links

Coenagrionidae
Insects of Fiji
Odonata genera